The 1939 Toronto Argonauts season was the 53rd season for the team since the franchise's inception in 1873. The team finished in second place in the Interprovincial Rugby Football Union with a 4–1–1 record and qualified for the playoffs, but lost the two-game total-points IRFU Final series to the Ottawa Rough Riders.

Preseason
The Argonauts participated in the 1939 city of Toronto championship series, winning the competition with victories over Balmy Beach and the University of Toronto varsity team.

Regular season

Standings

Schedule

Postseason

References

Toronto Argonauts seasons